Dory Nunatak is an isolated sandstone nunatak, 1.2 nautical miles (2.2 km) long, rising above the southwest part of Flight Deck Neve, 1.5 nautical miles (3 km) southwest of Dotson Ridge, in the Convoy Range, Victoria Land. One of a group of nautical names in the Convoy Range, it was so named by a 1989–90 New Zealand Antarctic Research Programme party because the feature appears to be sailing in the midst of the glacier névé like a small dory type boat.

References 

Nunataks of Victoria Land
Scott Coast